Slavomolisano, also known as Molise Slavic or Molise Croatian, is a variety of Shtokavian Croatian spoken by Italian Croats in the province of Campobasso, in the Molise Region of southern Italy, in the villages of Montemitro, Acquaviva Collecroce and San Felice del Molise. There are fewer than 1,000 active speakers, and fewer than 2,000 passive speakers.

It has been preserved since a group of Croats emigrated from Dalmatia due to the advancing Ottoman Turks. The residents of these villages speak a Shtokavian dialect with an Ikavian accent, and a strong Southern Chakavian adstratum. The Molise Croats consider themselves to be Slavic Italians, with South Slavic heritage and who speak a Slavic language, rather than simply ethnic Slavs or Croats.

History

According to evidence Molise Croats arrived in the early 16th century. The documents from the episcopal archive of Termoli indicate that Molise Croats arrived 1518 in Stifilić (San Felice). A stone inscription on the church in Palata, destroyed in 1930s, read Hoc Primum Dalmatiae Gentis Incoluere Castrum Ac Fundamentis Erexere Templum Anno 1531 (Residents of Dalmatia first settled the town and founded the church in 1531). The absence of any Turkish word additionally proves this dating.

The language of Molise Croats is considered to be important because of its archaism, preserved old folk songs and tradition. The basic vocabulary was done by Milan Rešetar (in monography), Agostina Piccoli (along Antonio Sammartino, Snježana Marčec and Mira Menac-Mihalić) in Rječnik moliškohrvatskoga govora Mundimitra (Dizionario dell' idioma croato-molisano di Montemitro), and Dizionario croato molisano di Acquaviva Collecroce, the grammar Gramatika moliškohrvatskoga jezika  (Grammatica della lingua croato-molisana), as well work Jezik i porijeklo stanovnika slavenskih naseobina u pokrajini Molise by Anita Sujoldžić, Božidar Finka, Petar Šimunović and Pavao Rudan.

The language of Molise Croats belongs to Western Shtokavian dialect of Ikavian accent, with many features and lexemes of Southern Chakavian dialect. The lexicon comparison points to the similarity with language of Sumartin on Brač, Sućuraj on Hvar, and Račišće on Korčula, settlements founded almost in the same time as those in Molise, and together point to the similarity of several settlements in South-Western and Western Istria (see Southwestern Istrian dialect), formed by the population of Makarska hinterland and Western Herzegovina.

Giacomo Scotti noted that the ethnic identity and language was preserved in San Felice, Montemitro and Acquaviva Collecroce only thanks to the geographical and transport distance of the villages from the sea. Josip Smodlaka noted that during his visit in the early 20th century the residents of Palata still knew the Croatian for basic terms like home and field work, but if the conversation touched more complex concepts they had to use the Italian language.

The language is taught in primary schools and the signs in villages are bilingual. However, the sociolinguistic status of the language differs among the three villages where it is spoken: in San Felice del Molise, it is spoken only by old people, whereas in Acquaviva Collecroce it is also spoken by young adults and adolescents, and in Montemitro it is spoken even by children, generally alongside Italian.

Features 
 The analytic do + genitive replaces the synthetic independent genitive. In Italian it is del- + noun, since Italian has lost all its cases.
 do replaced by od.
 Disappearance of the neuter gender for nouns. In the Montemitro dialect, however, all neuter nouns have become masculine, and vowel lowering has not occurred.
 Some feminine -i- stem nouns have become masculine. Those that have not have instead gained a final -a and joined the -a- stem inflectional paradigm. Thus feminine kost, "bone", has become masculine but retained its form, while feminine stvar, "thing", has become stvarḁ but retained its gender.
 Simplification of declension classes. All feminine nouns have the same case inflection paradigm, and all masculine nouns have one of two case inflection paradigms (animate or inanimate).
 Only the nominative, dative, and accusative cases can be used in their bare forms (without prepositions), and even then only when expressing the syntactic roles of subject, direct object, or recipient.
 Loss of the locative case.
 Slavic verb aspect is preserved, except in the past tense imperfective verbs are attested only in the Slavic imperfect (bihu, they were), and perfective verbs only in the perfect (je izaša, he has come out).  There is no colloquial imperfect in the modern West South Slavic languages. Italian has aspect in the past tense that works in a similar fashion (impf. portava, "he was carrying", versus perf. ha portato, "he has carried").
 Slavic conjunctions replaced by Italian or local ones: ke, "what" (Cr. što, also ke - Cr. da, "that", It. che); e, oš, "and" (Cr i, It. e); ma, "but" (Cr. ali, no, It. ma); se, "if" (Cr. ako, It. se).
 An indefinite article is in regular use: na, often written 'na, possibly derived from earlier jedna, "one", via Italian una.
 Structural changes in genders.  Notably, njevog does not agree with the possessor's gender (Cr. njegov or njezin, his or her). Italian suo and its forms likewise does not, but with the object's gender instead.
 As in Italian, the perfective enclitic is tightly bound to the verb and always stands before it: je izaša, "is let loose" (Cr. facul. je izašao or izašao je), Italian è rilasciato.
 Devoicing or loss of final short vowels, thus e.g. mlěko > mblikḁ, "milk", more > mor, "sea", nebo > nebḁ, "sky".

Phonology

Consonants
The consonant system of Molise Slavic is as follows, with parenthesized consonants indicating sounds that appear only as allophones:

However, in cases where standard Croatian  reflects Proto-Slavic *jt, the corresponding phoneme in Molise Slavic is instead . In some cases standard  corresponds to Molise , as in Chakavian.
 The velar fricative  is inserted by some speakers between vowels to eliminate hiatus; some speakers use  in this role instead.
  is realized as  before velar plosives.
 A prothetic  is regularly inserted before initial .
Etymologically, it derives from a  next to an unvoiced plosive; thus standard Croatian  (‘thing’) corresponds to Molise Slavic .
 After a short vowel, the following consonant may optionally be geminated.

Vowels
The vocalic system of Molise Slavic has seven distinct vowel qualities, as follows:

 Besides these vowels, there is also a syllabic  that functions as a vowel.
 There are two tones, rising and falling. A falling tone can be found only on single stressed initial syllables. A rising tone spreads over two equally-stressed syllables (or one stressed followed by one more stressed), except in cases where the second syllable has been lost. If the second syllable is long, some speakers only stress the second syllable.
 An opposition exists between long and short vowels, but only in stressed position. Vowels with a falling tone are sometimes long, and the second vowel with a rising tone is always long unless it is word-final, in which case the first vowel with a rising tone is long instead if the second vowel is voiceless or lost. Vowel length is only distinctive with falling tone; with rising tone, it is entirely predictable.
  appears as an allophone of unstressed , especially next to nasal consonants.
 Etymologically short vowels become voiceless in final position.

Samples 

A text collected by Milan Rešetar in 1911 (here superscripts indicate voiceless vowels):

A section of The Little Prince, as translated into Molise Slavic by Walter Breu and Nicola Gliosca:

An anonymous poem (reprinted in Hrvatske Novine: Tajednik Gradišćanskih Hrvatov, winner of a competition in Molise):

 SIN MOJ
    Mo prosič solite saki dan
    ma što činiš, ne govoreš maj
    je funia dan, je počela noča,
    maneštra se mrzli za te čeka.
    Letu vlase e tvoja mat
    gleda vane za te vit.
    Boli život za sta zgoro,
    ma samo mat te hoče dobro.
    Sin moj!
    Nimam već suze za još plaka
    nimam već riče za govorat.
    Srce se guli za te misli
    što ti prodava, oni ke sve te išće!
    Palako govoru, čelkadi saki dan,
    ke je dola droga na vi grad.
    Sin moj!
    Tvoje oč, bihu toko lipe,
    sada jesu mrtve,
    Boga ja molim, da ti živiš
    droga ja hočem da ti zabiš,
    doma te čekam, ke se vrniš,
    Solite ke mi prosiš,
    kupiš paradis, ma smrtu platiš.

Dictionaries 
 From: Josip Lisac: Dva moliškohrvatska rječnika, Mogućnosti 10/12, 2000.
 Walter Breu-Giovanni Piccoli (con aiuto di Snježana Marčec), Dizionario croatomolisano di Acquaviva-Collecroce, 2000, Campobasso 2000
 Ag. Piccoli-Antonio Samartino, Dizionario dell' idioma croato-molisano di Montemitro/Rječnik moliškohrvatskih govora Mundimitra, Matica Hrvatska Mundimitar - Zagreb, 2000.
 Giovanni Piccoli: Lessico del dialetto di Acquaviva-Collecroce, Rome, 1967
 Božidar Vidov: Rječnik ikavsko-štokavskih govora molizanskih Hrvata u srednjoj Italiji, Mundimitar, Štifilić, Kruč, Toronto, 1972.
 Tatjana Crisman: Dall' altra parte del mare. Le colonie croate del Molise, Rome, 1980
 Angelo Genova: Ko jesmo bolje: Ko bihmo, Vasto, 1990.

See also
Molise Croats
Chakavian
Shtokavian
Southwestern Istrian

References

Bibliography
 Aranza, Josip (1892), Woher die südslavischen Colonien in Süditalien (Archiv für slavische Philologie, XIV, pp. 78–82, Berlin.
 Bada, Maria (2005), “Sociolinguistica interazionale nelle comunità croatofone del Molise e in contesto scolastico”, Itinerari, XLIV, 3: 73-90.
 Bada, Maria (2007a), “Istruzione bilingue e programmazione didattica per le minoranze alloglotte: l’area croato-molisana”, Itinerari, XLVI, 1: 81-103.
 Bada, Maria (2007b), “The Nā-naš Variety in Molise (Italy): Sociolinguistic Patterns and Bilingual Education”, Proceedings of the 11th International Conference on Minority Languages (ICML 11), University of Pécs, Hungary, 5–6 July 2007.
 Bada, Maria (2007c), "Repertori allofoni e pratiche metacomunicative in classe: il caso del croato-molisano”. In: C. Consani e P. Desideri (a cura di), "Alloglossia e comunità alloglotte nell’Italia contemporanea. Teorie, applicazioni e descrizioni, prospettive". Atti del XLI Congresso Internazionale della Società Italiana di Linguistica (SLI), 27–29 settembre 2007, Bulzoni, Roma: 317-338.
 Bada, Maria (2008a), “Politica linguistica e istruzione bilingue nell’area croatofona del Molise”. In: G. Agresti e F. Rosati (a cura di), "Les droits linguistiques en Europe et ailleurs /Linguistic Rights: Europe and Beyond", Atti delle Prime Giornate dei Diritti Linguistici. Università di Teramo, 11-12 giugno 2007, Aracne, Roma: 101-128. abstract pdf
 Bada, Maria (2008b), “Acquisition Planning, autopercezione dei parlanti alloglotti e competenza metalinguistica”. In: G. Berruto, J. Brincat, S. Caruana e C. Andorno (a cura di), "Atti dell'8° Congresso dell'Associazione Italiana di Linguistica Applicata. Lingua, cultura e cittadinanza in contesti migratori. Europa e area mediterranea", Malta, 21-22 febbraio 2008, Guerra, Perugia: 191-210.
 Bada, Maria (2009a), "La minoranza croata del Molise: un'indagine sociolinguistica e glottodidattica". In: Rita Franceschini (a cura di) "Le facce del plurilinguismo: fra metodologia, applicazione e neurolinguistica", Franco Angeli, Milano: 100-169.
 Badurina, Teodoro (1950), Rotas Opera Tenet Arepo Sator Rome.
 Barone, Charles, La parlata croata di Acquaviva Collecroce. Studio fonetico e fonologico, Firenze, Leo S. Olschki Editor, MCMXCV, p. 206 (Accademia Toscana di Scienze e Lettere »La Colombaria«. »Studi CXLVI).
 Breu, W. (1990), Sprache und Sprachverhalten in den slavischen Dörfern des Molise (Süditalien). In: W. BREU (a cura di), Slavistische Linguistik 1989. Münich, 35 65.
 Breu, W. (1998), Romanisches Adstrat im Moliseslavischen. In: Die Welt der Slaven 43, 339-354.
 Breu, W. / Piccoli, G. con la collaborazione di Snježana Marčec (2000), Dizionario croato molisano di Acquaviva Collecroce. Dizionario plurilingue della lingua slava della minoranza di provenienza dalmata di Acquaviva Collecroce in Provincia di Campobasso. Dizionario, registri, grammatica, testi. Campobasso.
 Breu, W. (2003a), Bilingualism and linguistic interference in the Slavic-Romance contact area of Molise (Southern Italy). In: R. Eckhardt et al. (a cura di), Words in Time. Diachronic Semantics from Different Points of View. Berlin/New York, 351-373
 Breu, W. a cura di (2005), L'influsso dell'italiano sulla grammatica delle lingue minoritarie. Università della Calabria. In: W. Breu, Il sistema degli articoli nello slavo molisano: eccezione a un universale tipologico, 111-139; A. Marra, Mutamenti e persistenze nelle forme di futuro dello slavo molisano, 141-166; G. Piccoli, L'influsso dell'italiano nella sintassi del periodo del croato (slavo) molisano, 167-175.
 Gliosca, N. (2004). Poesie di un vecchio quaderno (a cura di G. Piscicelli). In: Komoštre/Kamastra. Rivista Bilingue di Cultura e Attualità delle Minoranze Linguistiche degli Arbëreshë e Croati del Molise 8/3, 8-9.
 Heršak, Emil (1982). Hrvati u talijanskoj pokrajini Molise, Teme o iseljeništvu. br. 11, Zagreb: Centar za Istraživanje Migracija, 1982, 49 str. lit 16.
 Hraste, Mate (1964). Govori jugozapadne Istre (Zagreb.
 Muljačić, Žarko (1996). Charles Barone, La parlata croata di Acquaviva Collecroce (189-190), »Čakavska rič« XXIV (1996) br. 1-2 Split Siječanj- Prosinac.
 Piccoli, A. and Sammartino, A. (2000). Dizionario croato-molisano di Montemitro, Fondazione "Agostina Piccoli", Montemitro – Matica Hrvatska, Zagreb.
 Reißmüller, Johann Georg. Slavenske riječi u Apeninima (Frankfurter Allgemeine, n. 212 del 13.11.1969.
 Rešetar, M. (1997), Le colonie serbocroate nell'Italia meridionale. A cura di W. Breu e M. Gardenghi (Italian translation from the original German Die Serbokroatischen Kolonien Süditaliens, Vienna 1911 with preface, notes and bibliography aggiornata). Campobasso.
 Sammartino, A. (2004), Grammatica della lingua croatomolisana, Fondazione "Agostina Piccoli", Montemitro – Profil international, Zagreb.
 Žanić, Ivo, Nemojte zabit naš lipi jezik!, Nedjeljna Dalmacija, Split, (18. marzo 1984).

External links 

Porijeklo prezimena o Moliski hrvati u Mundimitru/Origins of surnames of Croats in Mundimitar
UNESCO Red Book on endangered languages and dialects: Europe
Schede sulle minoranze tutelate dalla legge 482/1999 Minority languages in Italy (site of University in Udine, in Italian)
Le Croate en Italie
Molisian Slavic at the University of Konstanz (Germany)
Download of the Italian Version (1997 © Walter Breu) of Milan Rešetar's Book (1911)
 Vjesnik Josip Lisac: Monumentalni rječnik moliških Hrvata, Jan 9 2001
 Autonome Region Trentino-Südtirol  Sprachminderheiten in Italien
 CGH - Gradišćansko-hrvatski Centar - Burgenländisch-kroatisches Zentrum Wörterbuch der Molisekroaten (Italien) wurde Donnerstag in Wien vorgestellt 

Vijenac 186/2001 Posebnost moliške jezične baštine - Dizionario dell'idioma croato-molisano di Montemitro — Rječnik moliškohrvatskog govora Mundimitra predstavljen

 

Languages of Molise
Croatian language
Endangered diaspora languages
Endangered Slavic languages
Articles citing ISO change requests